Woo Hee-jong (Korean: 우희종, born 21 January 1958) is a South Korean educator and politician. He has been a professor of veterinary science at Seoul National University since 1992. He was one of the co-Presidents of the Platform Party, along with Choi Bae-geun.

Born in Seoul, Woo earned a bachelor's degree in veterinary science at Seoul National University in 1981. He then continued his postgraduate studies at University of Tokyo. Following the graduation, he worked as a lecturer at University of Pennsylvania, Harvard University and Boston University. In 2020, he established a new party, For the Citizens, in which was later renamed as the Platform Party.

Woo harshly criticised the-then President Lee Myung-bak for importing American beef to South Korea, which was related to mad cow disease. Critics denounced him for exaggerating the disease.

References 

1958 births
Living people
South Korean politicians
South Korean educators
Seoul National University alumni
University of Tokyo alumni
People from Seoul